William Clarence 'Billy' Holzrichter (January 1, 1922 - March 23, 2005) was an American international table tennis player. 

He won a silver medal at the 1947 World Table Tennis Championships in the men's team event and a bronze medal in the mixed doubles with Davida Hawthorn.

He was inducted into the USA Table Tennis Hall of Fame in 1980. 

Holzrichter died on March 23, 2005 at the age of 83.

See also
 List of table tennis players
 List of World Table Tennis Championships medalists

References

American male table tennis players
1922 births
2005 deaths
World Table Tennis Championships medalists
20th-century American people